Abu Asim Azmi (born 8 August 1955) is a member of the Maharashtra Legislative Assembly. He represents the Mankhurd Shivaji Nagar Constituency, Mumbai. He belongs to the Samajwadi Party.

He is the President of the Maharashtra state branch of the Samajwadi Party (SP). He currently represents Mankhurd Shivaji Nagar of Mumbai Suburban District in the Maharashtra Legislative Assembly.

Politics
Azmi entered politics and in 1995, under his leadership, the Samajwadi Party (SP) won two seats in the Maharashtra state assembly.

In 2004, entering his first election cycle, Azmi was defeated by Yogesh Patil of the Shiv Sena  from Bhiwandi constituency. From 2002 to 2008, Azmi was the Member of Parliament (MP) for Rajya Sabha.

In the 2009 Lok Sabha election, Azmi was defeated by Gurudas Kamat (Congress). However, in 2009, Azmi was elected to the Maharashtra Assembly where he served for two terms. He successfully contested the seats of Mankhurd-Shivaji Nagar and Bhiwandi (East), and under rules limiting successful candidates to one region, he chose Mankhurd-Shivaji Nagar.

Azmi is the only MLA from Maharashtra to have won from 2 seats simultaneously in one election.

Azmi has secured three consecutive wins in his Mankhurd Shivaji Nagar Constituency from 2009 to 2024.

Controversies

Comments on Shakti Mill Rape Case 
In 2013, on the Shakti Mill Rape Case, Azmi told Mid-Day, "Any woman if, whether married or unmarried, goes along with a man, with or without her consent, should be hanged. Rape is punishable by hanging in Islam. But here, nothing happens to women, only to men. Even the woman is guilty. Girls complain when someone touches them, and even when someone doesn't touch them. It becomes a problem then ... If rape happens with or without consent, it should be punished as prescribed in Islam." He also said, "See, I don't know what context he said it in. But, at times, the wrong people are awarded the death penalty. Boys do it in josh (Hindi: excitement), but what can I say in this? The death sentence should be given. I won't speak against Islam." Azmi's comments were widely criticized in India. His daughter-in-law and actress, Ayesha Takia, said she was deeply embarrassed and ashamed of comments made by her father-in-law.

Comments on Muslim Leadership 

In a video, Azmi is seen saying: "A Muslim who wants to build own leadership should go to Pakistan, this is secular India where our leaders are going to be Hindus."

Members of Legislative Assembly

Key

See also 

 2013 Mumbai gang rape

References

External links 
 

Samajwadi Party politicians from Maharashtra
Rajya Sabha members from Uttar Pradesh
Living people
1955 births
21st-century Indian Muslims
People from Azamgarh district
Maharashtra MLAs 2014–2019
People from Mumbai Suburban district